The  is a railway line that parallels the coastline of the Kii Peninsula in Japan between Mie Prefecture and Wakayama Prefecture.

The line is operated by Central Japan Railway Company (JR Central) from Kameyama, the eastern terminus, to Shingū, and by West Japan Railway Company (JR West) from Shingū to Wakayamashi, the western terminus.

The line has connections with through service, to the Kansai Main Line for Nagoya via Ise Railway, and to the Hanwa Line at Wakayama terminus for Osaka.

Basic data
Operators, distances:
Total: 384.2 km
Central Japan Railway Company (category 1)
Kameyama - Shingū: 180.2 km
West Japan Railway Company (category 1)
Shingū - Wakayamashi: 204.0 km
1.0 km is property of Nankai Electric Railway shortly from Wakayamashi Station.
Japan Freight Railway Company (category 2)
Kameyama - Shingū: 180.2 km
Shingū - Kii-Sano: 6.4 km
Track
Double: Kii-Tanabe - Wakayama
Single: the remainder
Traction
Kameyama - Shingū: internal combustion
Shingū - Wakayama - Wakayamashi: Electrified 1,500 V DC
Railway signalling:
Kameyama - Shingū: Special Automatic (:ja:閉塞方式#特殊自動閉塞式), a simplified automatic system
Shingū - Wakayama: Automatic
Centralized traffic control (CTC) center:
Kameyama - Shingū: Tōkai Operation Control Center
Shingū - Wakayamashi: Tennōji Operation Control Center

Services

Stations

Kameyama to Shingū (JR Central)

Shingū to Wakayama (Kinokuni Line) (JR West)

Wakayama to Wakayamashi (JR West)

Rolling stock

JR Central
 KiHa 25 (since 1 August 2015)
 KiHa 75 (Mie rapid service)
 KiHa 85 (Nanki limited express)

JR West
 103 series
 105 series
 113 series
 117 series
 223 series (0 and 2500 subseries)
 225-5000 series
 227 series (from Spring 2019)
 283 series (Kuroshio limited express)
 287 series (Kuroshio limited express)
 289 series (Kuroshio limited express)

Former

Passenger
 165 series
 221 series (until March 2011)
 381 series (until 30 October 2015)
 485 series
 KiHa 10 series
 KiHa 11 (until July 2015)
 KiHa 20 series
 KiHa 30 series
 KiHa 40 series
 KiHa 45 series
 KiHa 55 series
 KiHa 58 series
 KiHa 65
 KiHa 81 series
 KiHa 82 series
 Nankai Electric Railway KiHa 5501, KiHa 5505

Freight
 EF15
 DF50
 C58
 D60

History

The line is composed of sections opened by four different railway companies, which were then nationalised and linked by the JGR/JNR.

In 1891, the Kansai Railway opened the Kameyama to Tsu section, with the Sangu Railway opening the Tsu to Shoka section in 1893. At the western end, the Kiwa Railway opened the Wakayamashi to Wakayama section in 1903, and was acquired by the Kansai Railway the following year. The Kansai Railway and the Sangu Railway were nationalised in 1907. In 1912, the Shingu Railway opened the Kii-Katsuura to Miwasaki section, extending the line to Shingu the following year. The company was nationalised in 1934. On the eastern side of the Kii Peninsula, the Japanese Government Railway (JGR) extended the line from Shoka to Owase in sections between 1923 and 1934, whilst on the western side, it extended the line from Wakayama to Esumi in sections between 1924 and 1938. In 1935, the Kii-Katsuura to Taiji section was opened by JGR, extended to Kushimoto the following year, and to Esumi in 1940, providing a link to Wakayama and Osaka. The successor to JGR, the Japanese National Railways (JNR), opened the Owase to Shingu section in stages between 1956 and 1959, completing the line.

Double-tracking
The Akogi to Takajaya section was double-tracked in 1909, with the Matsusaka to Tokuwa section double-tracked two years later. In 1944, both sections were returned to single track and the recovered materials recycled for the Japanese war effort. The Wakayama to Kii-Tanabe section was double-tracked in stages between 1964 and 1978.

Electrification
The line was electrified between Wakayama and Shingu in 1978, with the Wakayama to Wakayamashi section being commissioned in 1984.

Other notable dates
CTC signalling was commissioned between Wakayama and Shingu in 1978, and extended to Kameyama in 1983.

Freight services ceased in 1986.

Former connecting lines

 Akogi Station: The Chusei Railway operated a 6 km  gauge line between Iwatahashi and Hisai between 1909 and 1942. At Hisai, it connected to the Dainippon Railway 15 km 762 mm gauge line to Ise-Kawaguchi on the Meisho Line between 1925 and 1942.
 Matsusaka Station: Mie Kotsu operated 20 km 762 mm line to Oishi between 1912 and 1964. The line was electrified at 600 V DC in 1927, although steam locomotives continued to be used until 1938.
 Tokuwa Station: The Ise Electric Railway "main line" connected here between 1930 and 1941.
 Funatsu Station: The Osugidani forest railway connected here to haul cedar. It was opened between 1929 and 1952 utilising 762 mm gauge, and featured a 17 km "main line" and nine branches of between 1 km and 11 km in length, as well as two cable-hauled inclines. The last line closed in 1974.
 Fujinami Station: The 9 km Arita Railway line between Yuasa and Kanaya which operated between 1915 and 2003 connected at this station.
 Kainan Station: The Nogami Electric Railway operated an 11 km line, electrified at 600 V DC, to Noburu-Yamaguchi between 1916 and 1994. Freight services operated between 1951 and 1971.
 Wakayama station - A 3 km line to Higashi-Matsue on the Nankai Kada Line opened in 1912. The line was electrified at 600 VDC in 1930, and closed in 1955.
 Kiwa Station: The Kishigawa Line commenced from this station from 1917 until the terminus was truncated 3 km to Wakayama in 1924.

See also
List of railway lines in Japan

References

External links
 JR Central official website 
 JR West official website 

Lines of Central Japan Railway Company
Lines of West Japan Railway Company
Rail transport in Mie Prefecture
Rail transport in Wakayama Prefecture
1067 mm gauge railways in Japan